Boys' artistic gymnastics qualification at the 2014 Summer Youth Olympics was held at the Nanjing Olympic Sports Centre on August 17. The results of the qualification determined the qualifiers to the finals: 18 gymnasts in the all-around final, and 8 gymnasts in each of 4 apparatus finals.

Start list

Results 
Note: On vault, the rankings are determined by the score of their first vault, the vault that counts toward their all-around total. Qualification into the vault final is based on the average of two vaults.

Vault 
Q= qualified R=reserve

References 

Gymnastics at the 2014 Summer Youth Olympics